Brian J. Druker (born April 30, 1955) is a physician-scientist at Oregon Health & Science University, in Portland, Oregon. He is the director of OHSU's Knight Cancer Institute, Jeld-Wen Chair of Leukemia Research, and professor of medicine. In 2009, he won the Lasker-DeBakey Clinical Medical Research Award and the Meyenburg Award for his influential work in the development of imatinib for the treatment of chronic myeloid leukemia (CML).  He has been called "Oregon's best-known scientist".

Education
Druker earned both his B.S. degree in chemistry and M.D. degree from the University of California, San Diego. He completed internship and residency in internal medicine at Barnes Hospital, Washington University School of Medicine in St. Louis from 1981 to 1984.

Teaching and research

Druker was a fellow in medical oncology at Dana–Farber Cancer Institute, Harvard Medical School, from 1984 to 1987.  He began working at Oregon Health & Science University (OHSU) in 1993.

In May 2007, he became director of the OHSU Cancer Institute—renamed the Knight Cancer Institute in October 2008 following a $100 million donation from Nike co-founder Phil Knight.

Druker has been widely recognized for his work in developing the cancer-fighting drug commonly known as Gleevec, but has been publicly critical of the drug's high price for patients.

Awards
Druker is an investigator of Howard Hughes Medical Institute (HHMI), and was elected to the Institute of Medicine of National Academies in 2003, the American Association of Physicians in 2006, and the National Academy of Sciences in 2007. Druker received the Golden Plate Award of the American Academy of Achievement in 2007. In addition to the Lasker Award and Meyenburg Prize, he was presented the Hope Funds Award of Excellence for Clinical Research in 2009.

In 2011, the American Society for Clinical Investigation presented Druker with its Stanley J. Korsmeyer Award in recognition of his advances in cancer research.  He was awarded the UCSF medal in 2013.  In 2014, he received the Hamdan Award for Medical Research Excellence (Targeted therapy category) and in 2018 the Tang Prize.

Personal
Druker is married to Alexandra Hardy, a one-time reporter for People magazine, and the couple have three children (as of 2009). An earlier marriage, to Barbara Rodriguez in 1990, ended in divorce in 1999.

References

External links
Brian Druker Seminars: "Imatinib as a Paradigm of Targeted Cancer Therapies"

1955 births
American hematologists
Members of the United States National Academy of Sciences
American oncologists
Oregon Health & Science University faculty
University of California, San Diego alumni
Living people
Howard Hughes Medical Investigators
Fellows of the American Academy of Arts and Sciences
Recipients of the Lasker-DeBakey Clinical Medical Research Award
Physicians from Portland, Oregon
Members of the National Academy of Medicine